A Stranger from Somewhere is a 1916 silent film directed by William Worthington. Universal's Bluebird Photoplays division produced and distributed the film. The movie featured Franklyn Farnum (playing a dual role), Agnes Vernon, Barney Furey, and Claire McDowell. The screenplay was written by F. McGrew Willis and  Walter Woods who were credited under the pseudonym Willis Woods.

The story revolves around a westerner named Sam Brockton. The hero becomes disillusioned with frontier life. He sells his ranch, making him an instant millionaire. He moves to the city, seeking a new way of life, but soon becomes disenchanted with his life's choices. A fortuitous event presents itself, and he meets a beautiful young heiress, Grace Darling. They immediately fall in love.

Meanwhile, he unwittingly becomes entangled with a gang of swindlers who plot to separate him from his wealth. The crook's machinations take twists and turns until culminating in a dramatic confrontation at the Darling mansion. Brockton enters a climatic knock-down-drag-out brawl with the scammers. The police show up in the nick of time, haul the criminals to jail and restore the peace. The hero has prevailed, gets the girl, and they live happily ever after. 

The film was released on November 13, 1916,  by Universal.

Plot
Sam Brockton owns a ranch but has become disenchanted with frontier life. He sells his property and moves to New York. While driving in the country, Brockton encounters a car with a blown tire. He pulls up and offers to help. While changing the tire, Brockton catches his first glimpse of young Agnes Darling. When the front tire blew, the beautiful heiress and her father were traveling to town from their summer retreat. Brockton is smitten, and she seems interested in him. After completing the repairs, the Darlings thanked Brockton and drove away.

Olga Veloski and Howard Dana are two local  passing the time on a hotel veranda. They witness Darling's mishap. The pair are aware of Darling's and Brockton's wealth. The swindlers know local millionaires shutter their homes and head to the country in the Summer. After Darling's drive away, Olga approaches the love-struck Brockton. She weaves a story about her good friend Agnes Darling. Olga claims Agnes is stopping by her home tomorrow. Olga tells Brockton she could introduce the heiress to him. Brockton readily agrees.

The next day, the  arrive at the unoccupied Darling mansion, followed by Brockton. Olga makes excuses for Agnes's delay and then suggests they play poker while they wait. Sam agrees, and the schemers bilk Brockton out of a large sum of money. During their  , Olga notices Brockton's resemblance to an acquaintance named Dippy Lewis.

Shortly after finishing their con game, the Darlings appear at their mansion. They find a bewildered Brockton and believe he is a burglar. Brockton clarifies what transpired while Olga and Dana hide. The Darlings feel sorry for Brockton and invite him to join them at a mountain hotel. The swindlers hear the invitation and then make their escape. After their departure, Olga recalls how a Dippy bore such a close resemblance to Brockton. The swindlers join their friend "Dippy Lewis" and dream up a new plan to have Dippy impersonate Brockton. Their idea is to send Dippy to the hotel in Brockton's place to woo Agnes Darling while believing she will fall in love and marry him.
Dippy arrives at the hotel. Although Dippy has an uncouth manner about him, he begins his courtship. Agnes tells Dippy she has arranged for them to go horseback riding. After a while, Agnes observes he can barely ride a horse. She has doubts about his background story of life on the frontier—utterly discouraged, Dippy returns to the lodge.
After his arrival, Dippy  many of the guests of their valuables. When the guests notice the missing items, they call the police. The police show up and investigate while the thieves gather their loot and escape.

Olga needs to ensure the real Brockton does not appear at the hotel while Dippy runs his . Olga instructs her gang to chloroform the real Brockton, then dispose of him in a cellar. Dippy turns up at the wrong time, and they chloroform Dippy instead. Unbeknownst to the crooks, the real Brockton has already departed for the hotel.
The real Brockton arrives at the hotel unaware of previous events. Still bothered about his poor manners and horsemanship, Agnes coldly greets him. The dejected Brockton is about to leave when he sees a couple of horses. He soothes the animals and then takes one for a short ride. Besides demonstrating his riding skills, it amazed Agnes how gentlemanly he had become. Agnes renews her interest in Brockton.

Brockton is on the verge of proposing to Agnes when he sees Olga and Dana. The con artists, believing Brockton is Dippy, encourage him to propose marriage to Agnes. Brockton proposes, and Agnes promises to marry him. Still thinking Brockton is Dippy, the hustlers discuss how they will divide the stolen loot. Agnes overhears this conversation and becomes exasperated. She confronts Brockton and invites him to meet her in the city, where they will straighten out this mess.
After Agnes leaves, Brockton berates the miscreants while claiming ignorance about their caper. Olga realizes this Brockton is not Dippy. Agnes and Olga return to the city on the same train, where Olga believes she hears Agnes planning an elopement. Once in the town, Olga knows she must quickly locate Dippy. Olga finds a trapped Dippy and releases him. She tells him to hurry to the Darling mansion since he must elope with Agnes before the Brockton arrives. Olga tells Dippy they will meet him at the estate.

The  show up at the mansion. When Dippy cannot persuade Agnes to elope, they decide to kidnap Agnes. Brockton arrives and senses Agnes's predicament. A fight breaks out between Brockton and the crooks. During the melee, Agnes breaks free and calls the police. The police arrive and arrest the bad guys. Sam Brockton explains everything to Agnes. They rediscover their love for each other, marry and live happily ever after.

Cast
{|
! style="text-align: left; width: 200px;"| Actor
! style="text-align: left; width: 200px;"| Role
|- style="text-align: left;"width: 400px;"|
|Franklyn Farnum||Sam Brockton / 'Dippy' Lewis||rowspan="16"|
|-
|Agnes Vernon||Agnes Darling
|-
|Claire McDowell||Olga Veloski
|-
|Barney Furey||Howard Dana
|-
|Arthur Hoyt||Daniel Darling
|-
|Helen Wright||Mrs. D. G. Darling
|-
|}

Production

Pre production

In the book, "American Cinema's Transitional Era," the authors point out,  One aspect of this transition was the longer duration of films. Feature films   were slowly becoming the standard fare for Hollywood producers. Before 1913, you could count the yearly features on two hands. Between 1915 and 1916, the number of feature movies rose 2 ½ times or from 342 films to 835. There was a recurring claim that Carl Laemmle was the longest-running studio chief resisting the production of feature films. Universal was not ready to downsize its short film business because short films were cheaper, faster, and more profitable to produce than feature films.

Laemmle would continue to buck this trend while slowly increasing his output of features.
In 1914, Laemmle published an essay titled -  In 1915, Laemmle ran an advertisement extolling Bluebird films while adding the following vocabulary on the top of the ad.

Universal released ninety-one feature films in 1916 including fifty-four Bluebird films.

Casting
 Franklyn Farnum (1878 - 1961) was born William Franklyn Smith on June 5, 1878, in Boston, Massachusetts. The  year-old actor would play the dual roles of Sam Brockton and Dippy Lewis. William Smith became a vaudevillian at age twelve and started acting on the stage in 1903. Early in his career, he decided William Smith was not a proper stage name. A local cub reporter suggested he change his name to Franklyn Farnum, cashing in on the last name of the stage and screen actors Dustin and William Farnum.  He changed his last name to Farnum and used his middle name as his first name. Farnum was a stage actor featured in several theatrical productions, including Broadway, before becoming a silent screen actor. This film was the third picture he made in his movie career. He would wind up acting in over four hundred films. He was unrelated to brothers and silent screen actors, Dustin Farnum, William Farnum, and Marshall Farnum. Refer to the section Myths on this page.
 Agnes Vernon (1895 - 1948) was born on December 27, 1895, in La Grande, Oregon. The  year-old actor would play Agnes Darling, the young heiress to the Darling fortune. Starting in 1914, Vernon had acted in seventy-one   films before taking on this role. This movie was Vernon's first feature film and her first film with Farnum. Farnum would become Vernon's introduction to comedy. This Bluebird release would be the only feature film Vernon made in 1916. During her career, Vernon would star in sixteen feature films. Franklyn Farnum would be the leading man in five of these projects. After completing this film, Vernon made her second film with Farnum, the short film "Little Partner." The film was released on December 19, 1916. During Vernon's movie career, her professional relationship with director Worthington produced twenty-two films, including six feature films.
 Claire McDowell (1877 - 1966) was born on November 2, 1877, in New York City. The  year-old actress would play the villainess, Olga Veloski. She had appeared in over seventy short films before her appearance in this movie. This would be her first feature and her first bluebird film. She would headline in her next Universal film - the Red Feather production of "Mixed Blood" released on December 18, 1916
 " Barney Furey" (1886 - 1938) was born Charles Manford Furey on September 7, 1886, in Boise, Idaho. He was  year-old actor when he played the villain, Howard Dana. Furey was active in movies between 1912 and 1937.
 " Arthur Hoyt" (1874 - 1953) was born on March 19, 1874, in Georgetown, Colorado. He was  years-old actor when he played Grace Darling's father, Daniel Darling. Hoyt made his Broadway debut in 1905 and his final Broadway appearance in 1911. He made his first film in 1914 and his last in 1947. During his acting career, he was a Character actor usually cast in a supporting role and acted in more than 275 films, including silents and talkies.
 " Helen Wright" (1868 - 1928) was born Helen Boyd on November 19, 1868, in St. Paul, Minnesota. She was  years-old when she played Grace Darling's Mother, Mrs. D. G. Darling. Wright was a well-known Universal character actress who appeared mostly in silent films between 1915 and 1930. She spent most of her career under contract at Universal. Wright would later appear with Emory Johnson in the Universal production of The Morals of Hilda released on December 11, 1916.

Director

William Worthington  (1872 - 1941) was born on April 8, 1872, in  Troy, New York. He was  years of age when he directed this film. Worthington started his career as a opera singer and stage actor, then began acting in movies in 1913. He directed his first short film in 1915.
Before directing this feature, most of his directorial experience was directing short films. He continued to direct films until 1925. Worthington would continue to perform as an actor until he died in 1941.

Screenplay

F. McGrew Willis (1891-1957) and Walter Woods (1881-1942) were scenarists. Their business advertisements in the trade journals would advertise themselves as "Willis - Woods Photoplaywrights," adding to the copy "Collaborating for Better Results." Thus, when they jointly wrote a Screenplay, they would use the pseudonym Willis Woods. The copyright for this film reads, "Credits: Willis Woods." After the completion of this project; the team went on to write a script for The Devil's Bondwoman released by Universal on November 20, 1916. Both were contract members of the Universal cadre of screenwriters.

F. McGrew Willis was born Frank McGrew Willis in Pleasanton, Iowa, on August 18, 1891. He was  years old when he worked on this project. In 1914, after experiencing a brief stage career with various traveling companies, he became a freelance screenwriter focusing on scenarios for short films. His first screen credit for a feature film came after writing the "The Quest" scenario in 1915.

Walter Woods was born in Pennsylvania on January 14, 1881. He was  years old when he worked on this script. Woods started as a leading man in several stock and road productions, eventually becoming a manager and director of stock productions. After he joined Universal, one of Woods's most significant projects was writing 20 two-reel episodes for the serial movie Graft. He wrote scripts for 76 films between 1915 and 1938.

Filming
The November 11, 1916 article The Moving Picture Weekly stated that Franklyn Farnum played a dual role and appeared in 340 of the 350 scenes in the movie "A Stranger From Somewhere."

Schedule

Working title
When films enter production, they need the means to reference the project. A Working title is assigned to the project. A Working Title can also be named an  In many cases, a working title will become the release title.
Working titles are used primarily for two reasons:
 An official title for the project has not been determined
 A non-descript title to mask the real reason for making the movie.

The working title for this film was -

Post production
Post-production is a crucial step in filmmaking, transforming the raw footage into the finished product. It requires skilled professionals working together to create a film that meets the director's vision and engages audiences.

The movie theater release of this film comprised five reels or roughly five thousand feet of film. The average time per reel is between ten and fifteen minutes. As a result, they estimated the total time for this movie to be between fifty and seventy-five minutes.

Studios
Universal produced and distributed this film. The interiors were filmed in the studio complex at Universal Studios located at 100 Universal City Plaza in  Universal City, California.

Release and reception

Official release
This film was  copyrighted to Bluebird Photoplays,  Inc., on October 30, 1916.
The official film release date to U.S. theaters was November 13, 1916.

Advertising

Advertising is essential for the success of a movie because it helps attract paying customers to the theater, resulting in higher box office revenues. A successful marketing campaign increases the hype by informing potential stakeholders about plotlines, actors, release dates, and other important information. Armed with this knowledge, a theater owner was better prepared to make a booking decision in a competitive market. In 1916, the most successful advertising for a movie was word-of-mouth, newspaper ads, and movie posters.  In short, effective promotion tactics had to convince potential customers to visit the movie house.

Movie posters are a specific form of poster art that advertises a certain film. Advertising movies in magazines can be an effective way to appeal to a viewership and theater owners. The Bluebird Photoplay ads signaled the start of a new period of creativity in the movie ad industry.
Chicago graphic artist Burton Rice became part of the Universal advertising department.
He was  years of age.

Most of Universal's 1916 bluebird advertisements featured Rice's abstract poster art and his inserts gathered worldwide attention. His brief tenure ended in December 1916, when he set sail for Europe to become an Ambulance driver in World War I.

Reviews

Critical Response
Movie reviews were critical opinions for theater owners and fans. Critiques of movies printed in different trade journals were vital in determining whether to book or watch the movie. Movie critics' evaluations of this film were mixed. When critics have divergent reviews, deciding whether to see or book the movie can be challenging, especially since mixed reviews do not mean it is a bad movie. In the end, it boils down to personal choices and how much value you place in the movie review and the reviewer.

 Peter Milne reviewed the movie in the November 18, 1916 issue of the" Motion Picture News," stated:
 The reviewer in the November 16, 1916 issue of Wid's observed:
 The reviewer in the November 4, 1916 issue of Motion Picture News, announced:

Audience response
Universal focused on producing and distributing films for small-town venues. Unlike major Hollywood studios, Universal owned no movie theaters and depended on the movie house proprietors renting their films from worldwide exchanges. Before leasing a film, picture house owners were concerned if the film was a potential moneymaker in their locale. Proprietors would subscribe to trade journals to assist them in making these financial judgments. Movie magazines would show the film's branding, critical reviews and publish other managers' viewpoints, including attendance numbers and revenue. Universal and owners alike depended on these movie reviews and movie house experiences.
These are some of the printed experiences of theater owners.

Myths

"'Franklyn Farnum" (1878-1961) was unrelated to the famous Farum family of actors. He was born "William Smith" on  June 5, 1878, in Boston, Massachusetts. His father died before he was born, leaving his mother penniless. He became a vaudeville actor at the age of twelve. A Cub reporter suggested he change his name to Franklyn Farnum, cashing in on the last name of the stage and screen actors Dustin and William Farnum. He entered silent films near the age of 40. During his career as a character actor and Hollywood extra, he appeared in at least 1,100 films.

Most media coverage of this movie and actor Franklyn Farnum cites his connections to William and Dustin Farnum. They always mention him as the younger brother of the acting duo. In other words, the young reporter's suggestion worked precisely as planned.

Preservation status
Many silent-era films did not survive for reasons as explained on this Wikipedia page.

According to the  Library of Congress American Silent Feature Film Survival Database, this film is extant.

Gallery

Notes

References

Glossary

Bibliography

Further reading

External links
 
 The Stranger from Somewhere at Silent Era
 
 

1917 films
1917 comedy films
1910s English-language films
American silent feature films
Silent American comedy films
American black-and-white films
Universal Pictures films
Films directed by William Worthington
1910s American films